is an action Japanese television drama with 11 episodes and one TV special, aired in Japan in 2006 on Fuji-TV, and followed by a movie Unfair: The Movie in 2007 with the same cast. Two other films have also been released: Unfair 2: The Answer in 2011 and Unfair: The End in 2015.

Synopsis
Yukihira Natsumi works as a police officer at the murder squad of Tokyo. She can differentiate felonies only into black and white but nothing in between ever since her father was murdered, so her guiding principle is to punish criminals by whatever legal action it takes. Beside Yukihira's success at work, her private life is a mess after creating a public scandal at a hostage-taking scene.

After another risky action taken at a hostage-site, her boss assigns her a new partner, Ando Kazuyuki, a rookie cop, who is supposed to look after her.

This drama follows Yukihira and Ando solving a serial murder case.

Cast
Ryoko Shinohara as Yukihira Natsumi
Eita as Ando Kazuyuki
Kato Masaya as Mikami Kaoru
Sadao Abe as Kokubo Yuji
Mari Hamada (濱田マリ) as Hasumi Anna
Shiga Kotaro as Yasumoto Masahiro
Mion Mukaichi as Sato Mio (7)
Inoue Jun as Kurume Ryuichiro
Kimura Tae as Makimura Kiyoko (35)
Susumu Terajima as Yamaji Tetsuo

External links
Review on j-dorama.de

2006 Japanese television series debuts
2006 Japanese television series endings
Fuji TV dramas
Japanese drama television series
Tokyo Metropolitan Police Department in fiction
Television shows based on Japanese novels